Minuscule 828 (in the Gregory-Aland numbering of New Testament manuscripts), ε219 (in the von Soden numbering of New Testament manuscripts), is a 12th-century Greek minuscule manuscript of the New Testament on parchment. The manuscript has survived in a complete condition. It contains marginalia.

Description 
The manuscript is a codex (precursor to the modern book), containing the text of the four Gospels on 176 parchment leaves (sized ). The text is written in two columns per page, 27 lines per page.

The text is divided according to the chapters (known as  / kephalai), and according to the smaller Ammonian Sections (234 sections in Mark, the last numbered section in 16:9). The Ammonian Sections are given with a references to the Eusebian Canons (written under Ammonian Sections).

It contains the Eusebian Canon tables at the beginning, tables of contents (also known as ) before each Gospel, lectionary markings, Synaxarion (liturgical book with hagiographies), subscriptions at the end of each of the Gospels, numbers of remata, numbers of stichoi, and pictures.

According to biblical scholar Frederick Henry Ambrose Scrivener, the Eusebian Canon tables are written beautifully.

Text 
The Greek text of the codex has been considered as a representative of the Caesarean text-type. The text-types are groups of different New Testament manuscripts which share specific or generally related readings, which then differ from each other group, and thus the conflicting readings can separate out the groups. These are then used to determine the original text as published; there are three main groups with names: Alexandrian, Western, and Byzantine. The Caesarean text-type however (initially identified by biblical scholar Burnett Hillman Streeter) has been contested by several text-critics, such as Kurt and Barbara Aland.  Hermann von Soden classified it to the textual family I. According to textual critics Kurt and Barbara Aland, it supports the Byzantine text 148 times against the original, the original 27 times against the Byzantine, and agrees 77 times with both texts; it has 64 independent or distinctive readings. Kurt Aland placed it in Category III of his New Testament manuscript classification system. Category III manuscripts are described as having "a small but not a negligible proportion of early readings, with a considerable encroachment of [Byzantine] readings, and significant readings from other sources as yet unidentified."

According to the Claremont Profile Method, it represents textual family ƒ in Luke 1, Luke 10, and Luke 20. It is fragmentary in Luke 10.

In  it has the additional reading ἐν τῲ λαῷ καὶ πολλοὶ ἠκολούθησαν αὐτῷ "among the people, and many followed after Him".

It lacks the text of Matthew 16:2b–3, and the text of the Pericope Adulterae (John 7:53-8:11).

History 

Gregory dated the manuscript to the 12th century, whereas other palaeographers dated it to the 11th century. The manuscript is currently dated by the INTF to the 12th century. The manuscript was written in Calabria, possibly in Rhegium.

The manuscript was examined and described by Antonio Rocci in 1882, and later by Kirsopp Lake. It was added to the list of New Testament manuscripts by Scrivener (626) and Gregory (828). Gregory saw it in 1886.

The manuscript is currently housed at the Biblioteca della Badia (A' α. 5), in Grottaferrata.

See also 

 List of New Testament minuscules
 Biblical manuscript
 Textual criticism
 Minuscule 826

References

Further reading 

 Jacob Geerlings, Family 13 – The Ferrar Group: The Text According to Matthew, Studies and Documents 19, 1961.
 Kirsopp Lake, Silva Lake, Family 13 (the Ferrar Group): The Text according to Mark with a collation of Codex 28 of the Gospels, Studies and Documents 11, 1941, pp. 20-21.

External Links
 Online images of Minuscule 828 (microfilm) at the CSNTM.

Greek New Testament minuscules
12th-century biblical manuscripts
Family 13